This is a list of county flowers of Norway.

References
This is based on the Norwegian Wikipedia entry.

Lists of flowers
County flowers
Flowers
Count Flowers